Energy and Civilization: A History is a 2017 book by Vaclav Smil, published by The MIT Press.

The book is a "comprehensive account of how energy has shaped society throughout history" and is an updated and expanded version of Smil's Energy in World History (1994).

External links 
 Energy and Civilization at mitpress.mit.edu

2017 non-fiction books
English-language books
MIT Press books